Jonathan Staley (1868–1917) was an English footballer who played in the Football League for Derby County.

References

1868 births
1917 deaths
English footballers
Derby County F.C. players
English Football League players
People from Newhall, Derbyshire
Footballers from Derbyshire
Association football defenders
FA Cup Final players
English baseball players